Humphrey Cooper Attewell (14 July 1894 – 15 October 1972) was a British trade unionist and politician.

Attewell was born in Northampton.  He served in World War I, then on his return became active in the National Union of Boot and Shoe Operatives (NUBSO).  He was Labour Member of Parliament (MP) for Harborough from 1945 to 1950.  After losing his seat, he served as the national organiser of NUBSO until his retirement in 1959.

References

External links
 

1894 births
1972 deaths
UK MPs 1945–1950
Labour Party (UK) MPs for English constituencies
National Union of Boot and Shoe Operatives-sponsored MPs